Year 1343 (MCCCXLIII) was a common year starting on Wednesday (link will display the full calendar) of the Julian calendar.

Events 
 January–December 
 January 14 – Arnošt of Pardubice becomes the last bishop of Prague and, subsequently, the first Archbishop of Prague.
 January 27 – Pope Clement VI issues his bull Unigenitus, defining the doctrine of "The Treasury of Merits" or "The Treasury of the Church" as the basis for the issuance of indulgences by the Catholic Church.
 April 23 – The St. George's Night Uprising begins in Estonia.
 May 4 – St. George's Night Uprising: The "Four Estonian kings" are murdered, at the negotiations with the Livonian Order.
 August 15 – Magnus IV of Sweden abdicates from the throne of Norway, in favor of his son Haakon VI of Norway. However, Haakon is still a minor, allowing Magnus to remain de facto ruler.
 August 31 – A naval league is formed between the Pope, the Republic of Venice, the Knights Hospitaller and the Kingdom of Cyprus, to prepare the Smyrniote Crusades.
 November 25 –  A tsunami, caused by an earthquake, devastates the Maritime Republic of Amalfi, among other places.

 Date unknown 
 Tsar Dušan conquers Albania.

Births 
 December 19 – William I, Margrave of Meissen (d. 1407)
 date unknown
 Emperor Chōkei of Japan (d. 1394)
 Constance of Aragon, queen consort of Sicily (d. 1363)
 Thomas Percy, 1st Earl of Worcester, English rebel (d. 1403)
 Nang Keo Phimpha, queen of Lan Xang  (d. 1438)
 Tommaso Mocenigo, doge of Venice (d. 1423)
 Paolo Alboino della Scala, lord of Verona (d. 1375)
 Alexander Stewart, Earl of Buchan, Scottish ruler (d. 1405)
 probable 
Geoffrey Chaucer, English poet (approximate date) (d. 1400)

Deaths 
 January 20 – Robert of Naples (b. 1276)
 May 29 – Francesco I Manfredi, lord of Faenza
 June 22 – Aimone, Count of Savoy (b. 1291)
 June 23 – Giacomo Gaetani Stefaneschi, Italian cardinal (b. c. 1270)
 September 16 – Philip III of Navarre (b. 1306)
 December 15 – Hasan Kucek, Chobanid prince (b. c. 1319)
 date unknown 
 Sir Ulick Burke, Irish nobleman
 Anne of Austria, Duchess of Bavaria  (b. 1318)
 Veera Ballala III, ruler of the Hoysala Empire (b. 1291)

References